The  House of La Fayette was a French family of Nobles of the Sword, from the province of Auvergne, established during the Middle-Age by the lords of the fief of La Fayette held by the senior branch of the Motier family.

History and members
Its most illustrious members are:
 Gilbert Motier de La Fayette (1380–1464): Lord of La Fayette, Marshal of France during the Hundred Years' War.
 François Leclerc du Tremblay (1577–1638), also known as Père Joseph: a French Capuchin friar, confidant and agent of Cardinal Richelieu, son of Marie Motier de La Fayette.

 Louise de La Fayette (1618–1665): favourite of Louis XIII of France.

 Madame de La Fayette (1634–1693): author of La Princesse de Clèves, France's first historical novel and one of the earliest novels in literature.

  Michel du Motier, Marquis de La Fayette (1731–1759) French soldier and father of Gilbert du Motier, Marquis de Lafayette
 Gilbert du Motier, Marquis de Lafayette (1757–1834): important participant in the American Revolution, the 1789 French Revolution and the 1830 French Revolution.

 Adrienne de La Fayette (1759–1807): wife of above.

 Georges Washington de La Fayette (1779–1849): a French soldier and politician, son of the two above

Marquisate de La Fayette
The fief La Fayette was raised to a marquisate by Letters patent in about 1690.

Brigadier des armées René-Armand Count and Marquis de La Fayette (1659–1694), son of Madame de La Fayette (1634–1693), and François Motier, comte de La Fayette (1616–1683), died on 12 September 1694 of an illness in Landau during the Nine Years' War. In his will of 11 May 1692, he bequeathed to his sixth cousin Charles Motier Champétières, Baron de Vissac (though an 11th generation descendant of their common patrilineality ancestor Pons Motier de La Fayette, a knight of the Seventh Crusade) and his male descendants; the name and property of the house of La Fayette, as the substitute for his brother Louis, Abbot of Notre-Dame de Valmont, and his daughter Marie-Madeleine, but leaves the enjoyment of the land of La Fayette to her. He did this to continue the name and title.

Edward Motier de La Fayette, Seigneur de Champétières, marquis de Vissac (1669–1740) takes the name of "La Fayette", pursuant to the substitution made in favor of his father (Charles Motier Champétières, Baron de Vissac).

Marie-Madeleine Motier de La Fayette (1691–1717) daughter of 
René-Armand and wife of Charles Louis Bretagne de La Trémoille Prince of Taranto, Duke of Thouars, peer of France, by will of 3 July 1717, transmits the land of Lafayette to her 6 years old cousin Jacques-Roch Motier (son of Edward Motier de La Fayette), as the representative of the Champétières branch of the family already substituted by her father in the name and title of the Seigneur of La Fayette.

Jacques-Roch Motier de La Fayette (1711–1734) passed marquisate de La Fayette to his brother, Michel du Motier, Marquis de La Fayette (1731 –1759), upon Jacques-Roch's death on 18 January 1734 while fighting the Austrians at Milan in the War of Polish Succession.

On 1 August 1759, Michel du Motier de Lafayette died by being struck by a cannonball while fighting a British-led coalition at the Battle of Minden in Westphalia, the marquisate de La Fayette went to his son, Gilbert du Motier, Marquis de Lafayette (1757–1834).

Descendants of Gilbert du Motier, Marquis de Lafayette and Marie Adrienne Françoise de Noailles

Gilbert du Motier, Marquis de Lafayette married Marie Adrienne Françoise de Noailles (2 November 1759 – 24 December 1807), the daughter of Jean-Paul-François, 5th duc de Noailles, and Henriette Anne Louise d'Aguesseau.  They had four children: Henriette (1776–1778), Anastasie Louise Pauline du Motier (1777–1863), Georges Washington Louis Gilbert du Motier, (1779–1849), and Marie Antoinette Virginie du Motier (1782–1849).

Georges de Lafayette married Emilie de Tracy, daughter of the Comte de Tracy, in 1802; they had three daughters and two sons: Natahlie, who married Adolphe Périer; Mathilde, who married Maurice de Pusy (1799–1864, son of Jean-Xavier Bureau de Pusy); Clementine, who married "Gustave" Auguste Bonnin de La Bonninière de Beaumont; Oscar Gilbert Lafayette (1815–1881), liberal politician; and Edmond (1818–1890) also a liberal politician. Mathilde and Maurice had a son, Octave Bureaux de Pusy (1832–1889). Nathalie and Adolphe had a daughter, Octavie Périer(1826–1876), who married Sigismond Pourcet de Sahune (1810–1903).

A 6 February 1892 presidential decree authorized the great-great-grandsons of the general, Paul Pourcet de Sahune (1861–1926), Gaston Pourcet de Sahune (1855–1942) and Gilbert Bureaux de Pusy(1871–1950), to add to their respective names "du Motier de Lafayette."

Virginie married Louis de Lasteyrie on 20 April 1803. They had four children: Pauline, who married Charles de Rémusat, Mélanie, who married Francisque de Corcelle (a friend of de Tocqueville), in 1831, Octavie, and their son, Adrien Jules de Lasteyrie (1810–1883) married Olivia de Rohan-Chabot (1813–1899), the daughter of the émigré Louis de Rohan, Vicomte de Chabot, and Lady Charlotte Fitzgerald, daughter of the second Duke of Leinster.

Mélanie and Francisque had a daughter Marie Henriette Hélène Marthe Tircuy de Corcelle (6 June 1832, Paris – 17 November 1902, Paris), who married Charles Adolphe Pineton de Chambrun (10 August 1831, Marjevols – 13 September 1891, New York), a lawyer from New York, at the Église de la Madeleine on 8 June 1859.

Adrien Jules and Olivia had a son, Louis de Lasteyrie who married Olivia Mills Goodlake; they had two children, Gui de Lasteyrie (b. 1878), and Louis de Lasteyrie (1881–1955).  Louis married Louise Chodron de Courcel, in 1908.

Juste-Charles de la Tour-Maubourg (Motte-Galaure, Drôme 8 June 1744, 28 May 1831), married Anastasie de Lafayette; they had two children:  Célestine Louise Henriette de Fay de La Tour-Maubourg (1799 – 16 July 1893), and Jenny de Fay de La Tour-Maubourg (6 September 1812 – 15 April 1897).  He was a French soldier and politician during the French Revolution, and the First French Empire.  His father was Claude Florimond du Faÿ (1712–1790) and his mother was Marie Françoise de Vacheron de Bermont (b.1712). His younger brother, Marie Victor de Fay, marquis de Latour-Maubourg, was a Cavalry Corps commander, survived the Russian Campaign and was wounded at the battle of Leipzig.

They had two daughters, Célestine, who married the Baron de Brigode, (who was mayor of Mayor of Annappes from 1814 to 1848), and Jenny, who married the comte Hector Perrone di San-Martino (12 January 1789 – 29 March 1849), on 2 February 1833. His father was Carlo Giuseppe Perrone di San Martino, and his mother was Paola d'Argentero-Bersezio. Henry Clay attended the wedding.

Ettore Perrone di San Martino graduated from Saint-Cyr in 1806, was wounded at the Battle of Wagram, and three times at the Battle of Montmirail. He was mortally wounded at the Battle of Novara in the Piedmont, Italy, on 22 March 1849, where he commanded the left division.

Jenny and Ettore had two sons, Paolo Luigi Perrone di San Martino (1834–1897), and Roberto Perrone di San Martino (1836–1900), and a daughter, Luisa Perrone di San Martino (1 October 1838 – 14 November 1880), who married Count Félix Rignon (1829–1914). Luisa and Félix Rignon had two children, Édouard Rignon (1861–1932), and Maria Rignon (15 March 1858 – 27 March 1950).

Édouard Rignon married Marie Nicolis de Robilant (24 March 1870 – 5 October 1960).  One of their daughters, Carolina Rignon (17 February 1904 – 20 September 1975) married Charles VII, Prince of Löwenstein-Wertheim-Rosenberg.  They had seven children, among whom: Maria (b. 1935, married to Archduke Joseph Árpád of Austria, with issue), Josephine (b. 1937, married to Prince Alexander of Liechtenstein, with issue), Christiane (b. 1940, married to Archduke Michael of Austria, Joseph Árpád's brother, with issue), Aloys-Konstantin IX, Prince of Löwenstein-Wertheim-Rosenberg (b. 1941, married to Princess Anastasia of Prussia, daughter of Prince Hubertus of Prussia, with issue), and Lioba (b. 1946, married to Moritz Eugen, Prince of Oettingen-Oettingen and Oettingen-Wallerstein, with issue).

Maria Rignon married Count Augusto Gazelli di Rossana e di Sebastiano.  They had a daughter, Luisa Gazelli (19 May 1896 – 27 April 1989), who married Don Fulco Ruffo di Calabria (12 August 1884 – 23 August 1946) in 1919, and were parents to Donna Paola Ruffo di Calabria (11 September 1937–). Donna Paola Ruffo di Calabria married Albert II of Belgium (6 June 1934–) at St. Goedele Cathedral in Brussels on 2 July 1959. Their son King Philippe of Belgium (15 April 1960 -) became king on his father's abdication in 2013.

Count Jean-François Pineton de Chambrun, the third husband of Raine Spencer, Countess Spencer, is also a descendant of Gilbert and Adrienne Motier de La Fayette.

Heraldry, and motto

Family tree 

|-
|style="text-align: left;"|Notes:

Based on sources:
 

 

 

 

 
 

|-
|style="text-align: left;"|
style="border-spacing: 2px; border: 1px solid darkgray;" 
-
  
 descent 
  
 adoption
-
  
 marriage
 1, 2
 spouse order

|-
|style="text-align: left;"|Notes:

References and notes

See also 
 Famille Motier de La Fayette
 Bourbon-Busset
 Arnauld family
 House of La Trémoille
 Duke of Noailles
 Pineton de Chambrun
 Château de Chavaniac
 Château de la Grange-Bléneaug
 Château-Dauphin
 Château de Saint Romain
 Château de Chouvigny
 Château de Tournoël
 Saint George Palace
 Valmont Abbey
 Bishops of Limoges
 Jacques de Silly
 Bataille de Cognat

External links

Généalogie de Carné, Alain de Carné en novembre 2006
Neil Jeffares, Dictionary of pastellists before 1800, Noailles Iconographical Genealogy
Marie Joseph Paul Yves Roch Gilbert du Motier, Marquis de Lafayette Collection, Library of Congress
Genealogie des Lafayette
Généalogie de la Maison Motier de La Fayette

French noble families
French marquesses
People from Auvergne
Gilbert du Motier, Marquis de Lafayette